Airlie Gardens is a  public garden in Wilmington, North Carolina.

History
It was created in 1886 as a private garden for the Pembroke Jones family by Mrs. Jones. The name 'Airlie' was derived from the Jones' family home in Scotland. It was designed as a lush, flowing, naturalistic Southern garden, with thousands of azaleas, camellias, magnolias, palms, and wisteria. German landscape architect Rudolf Topel, transformed the garden to a picturesque garden. In 1999, it was purchased by New Hanover County.

In 2018, more than 300 trees were felled due to Hurricane Florence.

Airlie Gardens is a participating member of the American Horticultural Society and offers reciprocal admission for other gardens, arboreta, and conservatories.

African-American folk artist Minnie Evans was the Airlie Gardens admissions gatekeeper for a number of years. In 1954, Evans created an oil on wood painting titled Airlie Oak, which is on display at the Smithsonian American Art Museum.

Airlie Oak
Airlie Oak is a 500-year-old southern live oak (Quercus virginiana) located on the grounds of Airlie Gardens. In 1967, Airlie Oak was registered as member number 238 in the Live Oak Society. At that time, it was designated the largest live oak in North Carolina.

Mount Lebanon Chapel and Cemetery
Located on the grounds of the gardens are the Mount Lebanon Chapel and Cemetery. The chapel, constructed by Thomas H. Wright around 1835, is the oldest surviving church structure in New Hanover County and part of the parish of St. James Church.

Gallery

See also 
 List of botanical gardens in the United States

References

External links 

 Official Website

Botanical gardens in North Carolina
Protected areas of New Hanover County, North Carolina
Wilmington, North Carolina
Sculpture gardens, trails and parks in the United States
Tourist attractions in New Hanover County, North Carolina